Rinaldo d'Este (shortly after 1221 – Apulia c. 1251) was a member of the House of Este.

He was son of Azzo VII d'Este Marquis of Ferrara from his first marriage c. 1221 to Giovanna (+1233). Azzo VII became the leader of the Guelph forces against Frederick II Hohenstaufen, King of Germany. He captured Ferrara from Ezzelino III da Romano and his Ghibellines troops. He became marquis (margrave) of Ferrara.

Rinaldo was the only son and heir. He married Adelaide, but she was barren. He had a relation to a Neapolitan laundress and an illegitimate child by her, Obizzo, born c. 1247. Soon after the birth, Obizzo and his mother were expelled from Ferrara; they settled in Ravenna. In 1238 Rinaldo and his wife were captured by Frederick II and died as prisoners in Apulia, in 1251. They were poisoned.

Azzo VII had three daughters but no other sons to continue his line; he saw in Obizzo the only chance of survival of the House of Este. Obizzo's mother was drowned in the Adriatic; shortly after Obizzo was legitimated by Pope Innocent IV, in 1252. He finally succeeded his grandfather in 1264 as marquis of Ferrara.

Family
In c. 1233 Rinaldo married Adelaide di Romano (+1251), daughter of Alberigo di Romano. He had no children.

From an illegitimate relation to a Neapolitan laundress he had a natural son:
 Obizzo II d'Este, Marquis of Ferrara (c. 1247 - 1293).

References

Obizzo 2
Assassinated Italian people
13th-century Italian nobility
People from Ferrara
Year of birth uncertain

fr:Rinaldo Ier d'Este
it:Rinaldo I d'Este